Berle is a village on the west coast of Norway. Berle may also refer to:

Berlé, village in the commune of Winseler, in north-western Luxembourg
Berle (surname), various people
Berle-Kari, viking chieftain in ninth-century Norway
Berle Adams (1917–2009), American music industry executive
Berle Brant (born 1989), Estonian footballer
Berle Sanford Rosenberg (born 1951), American operatic tenor and vocal coach
Berle M. Schiller (born 1944), Judge of the United States District Court for the Eastern District of Pennsylvania